Nangpa La ( also known as ) (el. ) is a high mountain pass crossing the Himalayas and the Nepal-Tibet Autonomous Region border a few kilometres west of Cho Oyu and some  northwest of Mount Everest.  
A foot-trail over Nangpa La is the traditional trade and pilgrimage route connecting Tibetans and Sherpas of Khumbu.  This was the location of the 2006 Nangpa La shootings.

Background
From this pass the Mahalangur section of the Himalaya extend east past Cho Oyu, Gyachung Kang, Everest, Ama Dablam and Makalu to the gorge of the Arun River.  The Rolwaling Himalayas including Gauri Sankar and Melungtse rise west and southwest of the pass.

In 1951 Dane Klaus Becker-Larsen and two Sherpas attempted the North Col, but turned back because of rockfall. He had minimal equipment and no mountaineering experience. He may have been the first Westener to reach Nangpa La.

The 1952 British Cho Oyu expedition led by Eric Shipton established a base at Lunak below the Nangpa La Pass. Shipton wanted to avoid any clashes with Chinese troops, but eventually agreed to a camp just short of the Nangpa La, and to send a party to attempt the first crossing of the Nup La pass which could be quickly withdrawn if Chinese troops were sighted. But Ed Hillary, George Lowe and three Sherpas crossed the Nup La col and then went "deep into Chinese territory" like "a couple of naughty schoolboys". 

In 2006, Chinese border guards of the People's Armed Police (PAP) opened fire on 75 unarmed Tibetan refugees as they traversed waist-deep snow in the Nangpa La shooting incident, killing 17-year-old Buddhist nun Kelsang Namtso and leading to the disappearance of a further 17 refugees.  Despite an attempted Chinese coverup, several foreign climbers at base camps on Cho Oyu managed to video and photograph the situation as it unfolded and the events drew widespread international condemnation when shown to the outside world.

See also
 Nangpa La shooting incident
 Pavle Kozjek

References

External links
 Terrain Map
 Satellite Image

Mount Everest
Mountain passes of the Himalayas
Mountain passes of Nepal
Mountain passes of Tibet
Mountain passes of China